Black Yankee Rock is the third album by Chocolate Genius. It was produced by Craig Street and released on Commotion Records on October 22, 2005.

The album cover is an image of a recolored battle flag.

Track listing
 "The Beginning of Always" - Thompson - 4:42
 "Amazona" - Browne, Thompson - 4:08
 "The Yes Eye" - Thompson	2:19
 "Tomboyrockstar" - Patscha, Thompson - 4:57
 "Chasing Strange" - Thompson - 3:28
 "Down So Low" - Browne, Thompson - 3:45
 "Rats Under Waterfalls" - Thompson - 3:33
 "It's Going Wrong" – Moby, Thompson - 5:37
 "Cry" – Thompson - 3:49
 "Forever Everyone" – Thompson - 4:13
 "Same Time Tomorrow" – Thompson - 3:14

References

2005 albums
Chocolate Genius, Inc. albums
Albums produced by Craig Street